The Central Committee (CC) composition was elected by the 8th Congress, and sat from 23 March 1919 until 5 April 1920. The CC 1st Plenary Session renewed the composition of the Politburo, Secretariat and the Organizational Bureau (OB) of the Russian Communist Party (Bolsheviks).

Plenary sessions

Composition

Members

Candidates

References

General

Plenary sessions, apparatus heads, ethnicity (by clicking on the individual names on "The Central Committee, elected VIIIth Congress of the RCP (B) 23/3/1919 members" reference), the Central Committee full- and candidate membership, Politburo membership, Secretariat membership and Orgburo membership were taken from these sources:

Bibliography

Sources

Central Committee of the Communist Party of the Soviet Union
1919 establishments in Russia
1920 disestablishments in Russia